is a passenger railway station in located in the city of  Tsu, Mie Prefecture, Japan, operated by Central Japan Railway Company (JR Tōkai).

Lines
Sekinomiya Station is served by the Meishō Line, and is 23.3 rail kilometers from the terminus of the line at Matsusaka Station.

Station layout
The station consists of a single side platform serving bi-directional traffic. There is no station building, but only a rain shelter on the platform. The station is unattended.

Platforms

Adjacent stations

History 
Sekinomiya Station was opened on January 20, 1938 as a station on the Japanese Government Railways (JGR) (which became the Japan National Railways (JNR) after World War II). Freight operations were discontinued in December 1951. Along with the division and privatization of JNR on April 1, 1987, the station came under the control and operation of the Central Japan Railway Company.

Passenger statistics
In fiscal 2019, the station was used by an average of 11 passengers daily (boarding passengers only).

Surrounding area
Saikyo-ji
 former Hakusan Town Hall
Tsu City Hakusan Junior High School
 Tsu Municipal Kawaguchi Elementary School

See also
 List of railway stations in Japan

References

External links

JR Central home page

Railway stations in Japan opened in 1938
Railway stations in Mie Prefecture
Tsu, Mie